The Old Bachelor is the first play written by British playwright William Congreve, produced in 1693. Henry Purcell set it to music. Originally staged by the United Company at the Theatre Royal, Drury Lane the cast included Thomas Betterton as Heartwell, George Powell as  Bellmour, Joseph Williams as Vainlove, William Bowen as Sir Joseph, Joseph Haines as Bluff, Thomas Doggett as Fondlewife, Cave Underhill as  Servant, Anne Bracegirdle as Araminta, Susanna Mountfort as Belinda, Elizabeth Barry as Laetitia, Elizabeth Bowman as Sylvia, Elinor Leigh as Lucy.

Plot
The 'Old Bachelor' is Heartwell, 'a surly old bachelor, pretending to slight women', who falls in love with Silvia, not knowing her to be the forsaken mistress of Vainlove, and is lured into marrying her, only discovering her true character afterwards, from the gibes of his acquaintances. The parson who has been brought in to marry them, however, is in fact Vainlove's friend Bellmour, who has assumed the disguise for the purpose of an intrigue with Laetitia, the young wife of an uxorious old banker, Fondlewife; and Heartwell is relieved to discover that the marriage was a pretence.

The comedy includes the amusing characters of Sir Joseph Wittol, a foolish knight, who allows himself to be really married to Silvia, under the impression that she is the wealthy Araminta; and his companion, the cowardly bully, Captain Bluffe, who under the same delusion is married to Silvia's maid. The success of this comedy was in part due to the acting of performers Thomas Betterton and Anne Bracegirdle.

Characters
Heartwell - an old bachelor secretly in love with Silvia
Bellmour - in love with Belinda
Vainlove - in love with Araminta
Sharper
Sir Joseph Wittol
Captain Bluffe
Fondlewife - a banker
Setter - a pimp
Araminta - in love with Vainlove
Belinda - her cousin, in love with Bellmour
Lætita - wife of Fondlewife
Silvia - Vainlove’s forsaken mistress
Lucy - her maid
Betty

See also
 Restoration comedy

Notes

References
Macaulay, Thomas Babington. The Comic Dramatists of the Restoration. London, Longman, Brown, Green, and Longmans, 1853.
Rump, E. S., (ed.) The Comedies of William Congreve, Penguin Classics (1986). 
Erskine-Hill, H., Lindsay, A. (eds), William Congreve: The Critical Heritage, Routledge (1995).
Henderson, A. G., The Comedies of William Congreve, Cambridge University Press (1982).
McKenzie, D., The Works of William Congreve: Volume I, OUP Oxford (2011), v. 1.

External links  

.
 

Congreve's Biography
The Library of William Congreve at the Internet Archive

1693 plays
Restoration comedy
Plays by William Congreve
Plays set in the 17th century
West End plays